Gnago is the name of two villages in south-western Ivory Coast. They are in the sub-prefecture of Sago, Sassandra Department, Gbôklé Region, Bas-Sassandra District. The villages are designated Gnago 1 and Gnago 2.

Gnago was a commune until March 2012, when it became one of 1126 communes nationwide that were abolished.

Notes

Former communes of Ivory Coast
Populated places in Bas-Sassandra District
Populated places in Gbôklé